Portugal participated in the Eurovision Song Contest 2021 with the song "Love Is on My Side" written by Pedro "Tatanka" Caldeira. The song was performed by the band the Black Mamba. The Portuguese broadcaster  (RTP) organised the national final  in order to select the Portuguese entry for the 2021 contest in Rotterdam, Netherlands. After two semi-finals and a final which took place in February and March 2021, "Love Is on My Side" performed by the Black Mamba emerged as the winner after achieving the highest score following the combination of votes from seven regional juries and a public televote.

Portugal was drawn to compete in the second semi-final of the Eurovision Song Contest which took place on 20 May 2021. Performing during the show in position 12, "Love Is on My Side" was announced among the top 10 entries of the second semi-final and therefore qualified to compete in the final on 22 May. It was later revealed that Portugal placed fourth out of the 17 participating countries in the semi-final with 239 points. In the final, Portugal performed in position 7 and placed twelfth out of the 26 participating countries with 153 points.

Background 
Prior to the 2021 contest, Portugal had participated in the Eurovision Song Contest fifty-one times since its first entry in 1964. Portugal had won the contest on one occasion: in 2017 with the song "" performed by Salvador Sobral. Following the introduction of semi-finals for the 2004, Portugal had featured in only five finals. Portugal's least successful result has been last place, which they have achieved on four occasions, most recently in 2018 with the song "" performed by Cláudia Pascoal. Portugal has also received  on two occasions; in 1964 and 1997. The nation failed to qualify to the final in 2019 with the song "" performed by Conan Osíris. In 2020, Elisa was set to represent Portugal with the song "" before the contest's cancellation.

The Portuguese national broadcaster,  (RTP), broadcasts the event within Portugal and organises the selection process for the nation's entry. RTP confirmed Portugal's participation in the 2021 Eurovision Song Contest on 16 October 2020. The broadcaster has traditionally selected the Portuguese entry for the Eurovision Song Contest via the music competition , with exceptions in 1988 and 2005 when the Portuguese entries were internally selected.

Before Eurovision

Festival da Canção 2021 

 was the 55th edition of  that selected Portugal's entry for the Eurovision Song Contest 2021. Twenty entries competed in the competition that consisted of two semi-finals held on 20 and 27 February 2021 leading to a ten-song final on 6 March 2021.

Format 
The format of the competition consisted of three shows: two semi-finals on 20 and 27 February 2021 and the final on 6 March 2021. Each semi-final featured ten competing entries from which five advanced from each show to complete the ten song lineup in the final. Results during the semi-finals were determined by the 50/50 combination of votes from a jury panel appointed by RTP and public televoting, while results during the final were determined by the 50/50 combination of votes from seven regional juries and public televoting, which was opened following the second semi-final and closed during the final show. Both the public televote and the juries assigned points from 1–8, 10 and 12 based on the ranking developed by both streams of voting.

Competing entries 
Twenty composers were selected by RTP through two methods: eighteen invited by RTP for the competition and two selected from 693 submissions received through an open call for songs. The composers, which both created the songs and selected its performers, were required to submit the demo and final versions of their entries by 30 November and 31 December 2020, respectively. Songs could be submitted in any language. The selected composers were revealed on 4 December 2020, while the competing artists were revealed on 20 January 2021.

Shows

Semi-finals
The two semi-finals took place on 20 and 27 February 2021. The first semi-final was hosted by Jorge Gabriel and Sónia Araújo while the second semi-final was hosted by Tânia Ribas de Oliveira and José Carlos Malato. In each semi-final eight entries competed and four advanced to the final based on the 50/50 combination of votes of a jury panel consisting of Marta Carvalho, NBC, Paulo de Carvalho, Rita Carmo, Rita Guerra and Vanessa Augusto, and a public televote.

In addition to the competing entries, Dora and Elisa performed as the interval acts in the first semi-final, while Agir and Portuguese Eurovision 1996 entrant Lucia Móniz performed as the interval acts in the second semi-final.

Final 
The final took place on 6 March 2021, hosted by Filomena Cautela and Vasco Palmeirim. The ten entries that qualified from the two preceding semi-finals competed and the winner, "Love Is on My Side" performed by the Black Mamba, was selected based on the 50/50 combination of votes of seven regional juries and a public televote. Carolina Deslandes and the Black Mamba were both tied for the first place with 20 points but since the Black Mamba received the most votes from the public they were declared the winner. "Love Is on My Side" is the first song performed entirely in the English language that was selected to represent Portugal at the Eurovision Song Contest. Ricardo Ribeiro, Ana Moura, Camané, Dino D'Santiago, Portuguese Eurovision 2018 entrant Cláudia Pascoal together with Clã, Filipe Sambado and Sérgio Godinho, and Elisa performed as the interval acts.

At Eurovision 
According to Eurovision rules, all nations with the exceptions of the host country and the "Big Five" (France, Germany, Italy, Spain and the United Kingdom) are required to qualify from one of two semi-finals in order to compete for the final; the top ten countries from each semi-final progress to the final. The European Broadcasting Union (EBU) split up the competing countries into six different pots based on voting patterns from previous contests, with countries with favourable voting histories put into the same pot. The semi-final allocation draw held for the Eurovision Song Contest 2020 on 28 January 2020 was used for the 2021 contest, which Portugal was placed into the second semi-final, to be held on 20 May 2021, and was scheduled to perform in the second half of the show.

Once all the competing songs for the 2021 contest had been released, the running order for the semi-finals was decided by the shows' producers rather than through another draw, so that similar songs were not placed next to each other. Portugal was set to perform in position 12, following the entry from Albania and before the entry from Bulgaria.

The second semi-final and the final were broadcast live, while the first semi-final was broadcast on a two-hour delay. The Portuguese spokesperson, who announced the top 12-point score awarded by the Portuguese jury during the final, was Elisa.

Semi-final 
Portugal performed twelfth in the second semi-final, following the entry from Albania and preceding the entry from Bulgaria. At the end of the show, Portugal was announced as having finished in the top 10 and subsequently qualifying for the grand final. It was later revealed that Portugal placed fourth in the semi-final, receiving a total of 239 points: 111 points from the televoting and 128 points from the juries.

Final 
Shortly after the second semi-final, a winners' press conference was held for the ten qualifying countries. As part of this press conference, the qualifying artists took part in a draw to determine which half of the grand final they would subsequently participate in. This draw was done in the order the countries were announced during the semi-final. Portugal was drawn to compete in the first half. Following this draw, the shows' producers decided upon the running order of the final, as they had done for the semi-finals. Portugal was subsequently placed to perform in position 7, following the entry from Malta and before the entry from Serbia. Portugal placed twelfth in the final, scoring 153 points: 27 points from the televoting and 126 points from the juries.

Voting 
Voting during the three shows involved each country awarding two sets of points from 1–8, 10 and 12: one from their professional jury and the other from televoting. Each nation's jury consisted of five music industry professionals who are citizens of the country they represent. This jury judged each entry based on: vocal capacity; the stage performance; the song's composition and originality; and the overall impression by the act. In addition, each member of a national jury may only take part in the panel once every three years, and no jury was permitted to discuss of their vote with other members or be related in any way to any of the competing acts in such a way that they cannot vote impartially and independently. The individual rankings of each jury member in an anonymised form as well as the nation's televoting results were released shortly after the grand final.

Below is a breakdown of points awarded to Portugal and awarded by Portugal in the second semi-final and grand final of the contest, and the breakdown of the jury voting and televoting conducted during the two shows:

Points awarded to Portugal

Points awarded by Portugal

Detailed voting results 
The following members comprised the Portuguese jury:
 Dino d'Santiago
 Dora
 João Reis Moreira
 Marta Carvalho

References

External links 
 

2021
Countries in the Eurovision Song Contest 2021
Eurovision